The McDonald Ice Rumples constitute an ice rise in the Brunt Ice Shelf bordering the Weddell Sea in Antarctica, covering an area of .

Ernest Shackleton's Imperial Trans-Antarctic Expedition reported a glacier in this vicinity in January 1915. It was named "Allan McDonald Glacier" after Allan McDonald of the British Association of Magallanes at Punta Arenas, who was chiefly responsible for raising funds for sending the schooner Emma on the third attempt, in July 1916, to rescue the 22 men of the Endurance left on Elephant Island.

It has now been identified with "Allan McDonald Glacier", and for the sake of historical continuity the UK Antarctic Place-names Committee has given the name McDonald to these ice rumples.

See also
McDonald Bank

References

External links
 An aerial photograph of the feature can be seen at photos1.blogger.com.

Ice shelves of Antarctica
Bodies of ice of Coats Land